The 47th is a 2022 play in blank verse by Mike Bartlett. It was premiered at the Old Vic Theatre, London in March 2022 and tells of an imagined future history focusing on who will become the 47th President of the United States, following Joe Biden.

Production history 
The 47th had its premiere production at the Old Vic Theatre from 29 March 2022 to 28 May. It starred Bertie Carvel as Donald Trump, Tamara Tunie as Kamala Harris, and Lydia Wilson as Ivanka Trump.

Cast and characters

Critical reception 
Arifa Akbar in The Guardian described Bertie Carvel as "devilishly good", but felt "this Trumpian satire feels too soon". Andrzej Lukowski for TimeOut describes the play as "tremendous entertainment, that explores the decline of American democracy in an infinitely more enjoyable way than the actual decline of American democracy we must all bear witness to". Writing for the Evening Standard, states that "the language and staging of The 47th is eloquent and clever, but it has surprisingly little to say about a monster so huge."

References 

2022 plays
Cultural depictions of Joe Biden
Kamala Harris
West End plays
Cultural depictions of Donald Trump
Plays by Mike Bartlett